Count Yorga, Vampire (also known as The Loves of Count Iorga, Vampire) is a 1970 American vampire horror film written and directed by Bob Kelljan and starring Robert Quarry, Roger Perry and Michael Murphy. It was followed by a sequel, The Return of Count Yorga.

Plot
A coffin is loaded to a truck at the Port of Los Angeles. The truck then climbs to a gated mansion in the Southern California hills.

A woman named Donna hosts a séance in hopes of contacting her recently deceased mother. At the party are several of her friends, including Donna's boyfriend, Michael Thompson, Paul, Paul's girlfriend Erica Landers, and close friend and doctor, Jim Hayes. Overseeing the seance is Count Yorga, a mysterious Bulgarian mystic who has recently moved to the states from Europe. Donna becomes hysterical during the proceedings and Yorga uses hypnosis to calm her. After the party is over, Erica and Paul offer to drive the Count home. Not long after they leave, Donna reveals to the others that she knows Yorga because he was her mother's boyfriend. They dated a few weeks shortly before her death. Furthermore, Yorga had insisted that her mother be buried rather than cremated per the deceased's wishes. Donna cannot recall seeing Yorga at her mother's funeral.

Meanwhile, Erica and Paul drop off Yorga at his home. Their van gets stuck in the mud outside of Yorga's mansion, although Paul insists the road was dry a minute ago. They resign themselves to spending the night in their van. After  sex they settle in to sleep. Yorga attacks them, knocking out Paul and biting Erica. The following day when Paul and Erica return to the city, Paul tells Michael about the attack. Paul did not see their attacker, and Erica does not remember anything.

Erica visits Dr. Hayes to have the mysterious bite wounds on her neck inspected. In contrast to her exuberant personality on the night before, Erica now seems despondent and listless. Hayes notices she has lost a lot of blood but is unable to diagnose the cause. He recommends rest and a high protein diet. Shortly after, Paul and Michael discuss the strange changes in Erica's behavior. They try to check in on her via phone, but she drops the phone to the floor without answering. The concerned men drive to her home where they find the place in disarray, and a hysterical Erica eating her kitten. She reacts erratically to their presence, first threatening them with violence and then attempting to seduce Paul before coming to her senses and breaking down.

They restrain her and call Hayes, who finds that Erica has suddenly lost a lot of blood and begins an emergency blood transfusion. Erica babbles incoherently, apparently afraid of something. She begs Paul to forgive her and to kill her.

Yorga awakens in his manor and heads to his basement which has been converted into a throne room where his two vampiric brides lie on slabs. One of them is Donna's mother, whom he made into an undead servant. He awakens them and commands them to have sex.

Although Michael is skeptical, the three men consider the possibility of vampirism as an excuse for Erica's behavior and agree to look into it while letting Erica rest. That night, Yorga visits Erica while Paul sleeps downstairs. Promising her immortality, he seduces Erica, drains her of her remaining blood, and takes her body back to his manor. Upon finding Erica missing, Paul rashly goes to Yorga's mansion to rescue her. Yorga quickly kills him by choking him to death, then having his servant Brudah (who has seemingly supernatural strength himself) break his back.

Michael alerts Hayes that Paul has gone to the mansion, and Hayes confides that Paul's lack of preparation will probably lead to his death. While mulling over his options, Hayes' girlfriend suggests involving the police, citing an eerily similar case of a baby being found in the woods, drained of its blood with bite wounds on the neck. He takes it to heart but is rejected as a deluded prankster following a recent rash of such calls. Hayes, Michael, and Donna go to the mansion themselves to inquire about Paul's whereabouts and keep Yorga active until sunrise. While Hayes distracts Yorga with enthusiastic questions about Yorga's occult experiments, Brudah rebuffs Michael's attempts to explore the mansion. Michael and Hayes switch places to keep Yorga off his guard, but Yorga becomes increasingly insistent that it is late and his guests must leave. Yorga distracts Hayes and strengthens his hypnotic control over Donna.

After leaving the manor, Hayes convinces Michael that killing Yorga will not be easy: vampires have greater strength and the wisdom that comes from living much longer than a "mere mortal". He also grimly adds they might have to kill Paul and Erica too if they have become vampires, since the vampire curse will make them evil and loyal to Yorga. They plan to attack later that afternoon in the hopes of killing Yorga in the daytime. Michael and Donna rest while Hayes studies vampire lore until he, too, falls asleep.

Yorga awakens Donna telepathically and has her sabotage Michael's alarm clock before having her come to the mansion. On her arrival, Brudah rapes her. When Michael awakens, he finds Donna gone and that it is nearly evening when he calls to awaken Hayes. Despite knowing how dangerous their chances are, they stock up on stakes and makeshift crosses before heading to Yorga's mansion as night falls. The two split up, and Yorga confronts Hayes. Both drop the pretense that Yorga is anything but a vampire, and Yorga leads Hayes into his basement where his vampire brides lie dormant. Hayes finds Erica's body among them, finding no heartbeat or pulse when he examines her. He then attacks Yorga with a cross and stake, while yelling out for Michael (who hears Hayes and begins to run in the direction of his call). Despite being held back by the cross, Yorga taunts Hayes while positioning him in front of his brides, then silently commanding them to awake and attack the unaware Hayes from behind. Hayes is forced to the floor and fed on by the vampire women.

As Yorga reunites Donna with her mother, Michael finds Paul's mutilated body while navigating the crypt. Brudah attacks him, but Michael mortally stabs him and manages to reach the throne room. He finds Hayes as he lays dying from bite wounds and blood loss. With his last breath, Hayes tells Michael where Donna is. Just as he does, Erica, now a vampire and completely under Yorga's control, and a fellow redheaded vampire charge into the room to kill him. Michael fends them off, chasing away the redhead while Erica pauses, giving Michael a chance to stake her, but despite seeing she is no longer the Erica he knows, he cannot bring himself to do so, and proceeds upstairs while she hisses at him.

On the way to the staircase, Michael encounters Brudah in the living room who eventually dies of his wounds. Michael reaches upstairs and confronts Yorga and Donna's mother. Yorga pushes Donna's mother into Michael's stake and flees, when Michael tries to give chase Yorga ambushes him outside the room intending to choke him to death. Michael rams the charging Yorga with his stake, killing him. Donna mourns her mother a second time before Michael collects her. He and Donna watch Yorga turn to dust.

As they start to leave, they are confronted by Erica and the redheaded bride, who remain vampires despite Yorga's death. They chase Michael and Donna downstairs until repelled by Michael's cross. As the vampire women are forced back toward a cellar, Erica glances ominously at Donna. Michael locks them in and drops his cross, believing the danger is over. However, as he turns to leave, Donna hisses and lunges at him, fangs bared, fully transformed into a vampire; he was too late to prevent Yorga from turning her (although there are no bite marks on her throat). The film ends with a shot of Michael's bloodied and lifeless corpse.

Production
The film opens with a narration by character actor George Macready, whose son, Michael Macready, produced the film and also played "Michael".

Origin of the film
The film was originally to have been a soft core porn film called The Loves of Count Iorga, and some prints of the film display this as the on-screen title. Quarry told actor/producer Michael Macready he would play the vampire role if they turned the story into a straight horror film.

Difficulties with the MPAA
Stephen Farber's 1972 book, The Movie Rating Game, details the problems that the film's distributor American International Pictures had in securing a GP rating (formerly known as M, later renamed to PG) from the Motion Picture Association of America, which initially was divided as to whether to give the film an R or X rating. AIP insisted that they needed an unrestricted GP rating for the film in order to get the film released into the largest possible number of theaters, most importantly drive-in theaters.

The film ended up going before the MPAA ratings board six times before being granted the GP rating, and two or three minutes of violent and sexual content were ultimately removed by AIP. Alterations to the movie's soundtrack were also required to lessen the impact of violent scenes that remained in the film.

Reception
Variety wrote that Robert Quarry had an "aristocratically handsome look and plays the part with a certain sinister intelligence (and) even a sly humor that befits a guy who has been around for several hundred years," adding that "The dialogue has a believable sound to it, and the playing of the principals is low-key and convincingly realistic." Roger Greenspun of The New York Times called Robert Quarry "the best chief vampire I have seen in years." Gene Siskel of the Chicago Tribune declared it "the best horror film of the year." Kevin Thomas of the Los Angeles Times wrote that "writer-director Bob Kelljan has freshened up the formula pretty well ... he and his attractive cast of unknowns do succeed in persuading us to go along with the hokum for the duration of the film's fast-moving 90 minutes." Kenneth Turan of The Washington Post called it "as good a horror film as we have had for some time" and "90 minutes of supremely diverting entertainment." Kenneth Thompson of The Monthly Film Bulletin wrote that "the understated acting and the tightly controlled, increasingly staccato tempo make this the most distinctive essay in the macabre since Night of the Living Dead."

Legacy
After the sequel The Return of Count Yorga, a third Yorga film was planned, which would have featured a broken Count living in Los Angeles's sewers and creating an army of undead street people, but it never materialised.

American International Pictures had planned at one stage to revive Count Yorga as an adversary for Dr. Anton Phibes in Dr. Phibes Rises Again. This plan was dropped, however, and Quarry appeared as the artificially young Dr. Biederbeck.

Home video release
Count Yorga, Vampire has been the subject of several home video releases in nearly all formats since the 1980s. In April 1991, the film was packaged as a Laserdisc double feature (Catalog Number ID7661HB), paired with the Vincent Price horror film, Cry of the Banshee; both films were not letterboxed, but employed a full screen, pan-and-scan process.

In 2004, MGM's Midnite Movies DVD line (which redistributed much of the American International Pictures horror catalog previously owned by Orion Pictures Home Video) released Count Yorga, Vampire and its sequel, The Return of Count Yorga as a DVD double feature. Both films were presented in the widescreen format, and included original theatrical trailers.

See also
 Vampire film
 Dracula

References

External links
 
 
 Robert Quarry on playing Count Yorga

1970 films
1970 horror films
American vampire films
American International Pictures films
Films directed by Bob Kelljan
1970s English-language films
American horror films
1970s American films